AL DÍA News Media is a media company based in Philadelphia that challenges mainstream media stereotypes of the Latino experience in the United States.

History 
AL DÍA was founded by Hernán Guaracao in 1994. It started as a modest monthly publication, an 8-page newsletter, published once a month. One year later, it became AL DÍA, a black and white Latino newspaper that joined the already crowded field of Spanish-language publications in the city. AL DÍA expanded the circulation of the newspaper beyond the traditional Latino neighborhoods of North Philadelphia to the entire city and the suburbs, including South Jersey and Northern Delaware.

In 2013, the free tabloid with 96% market penetration circulates 42,000 copies a week through its network of street-corner boxes.

For its 20th anniversary in 2012, it launched 200 Years of Latino History in Philadelphia, its 228-page photographic record of the diverse Hispanic communities in the region.

References

Bibliography 

 Hernán Guaracao Calderón
 Photos document 200 years of Latino history in Philadelphia

Newspapers published in Philadelphia